Emily Williams (born 8 October 1984) is a New Zealand singer, songwriter and actress. She rose to fame in 2005 on the third season of Australian Idol and became the runner-up of the competition. After Idol, Williams signed with Sony BMG Australia and enjoyed commercial success as a member of the Australian girl group Young Divas. The group released two top-ten albums, Young Divas (2006) and New Attitude (2007), and achieved three top-fifteen singles, including the hugely successful "This Time I Know It's for Real". After the Young Divas disbanded in 2008 and Williams' contract with Sony BMG ended, she began releasing her solo music independently. Williams' debut solo single "Spellbound" was released in 2010, followed by the release of her debut solo album Uncovered in 2012.

Early life
Emily Williams was born on 8 October 1984 in South Auckland, New Zealand, to a Samoan family. Williams' has an older sister – Lavina Williams, who was a contestant on Australian Idol in 2006 and also a younger brother – J.Williams, a singer/dancer in New Zealand. During Willams' early years, her father was very strict when it came to devoting yourself to religion and music. Before appearing on Idol, she worked as a forklift operator from Inala, Queensland.

Career

2005: Australian Idol
Williams auditioned for the third season of Australian Idol in 2005. During the season, she scored three touchdowns from judge Mark Holden. On 15 November 2005, betting agency Centrebet announced their final-week prediction that Williams would win the competition, with her odds at $1.36 and Kate DeAraugo at $3.00. However, on 21 November 2005, it was announced that the winner was DeAraugo.

2006–08: Young Divas 

In January 2006, Sony BMG Australia announced that William's had signed a recording contract with their label, and that she would release her debut album later that year. She re-located to Melbourne to begin writing and co-writing tracks with both local and international songwriters. However, Williams' album was never released.

In early 2006, Williams was asked by her record label to be part of a girl group concept, with previous Australian Idol contestants Paulini, Ricki-Lee Coulter and Kate DeAraugo, for a 17-date national tour to promote all four singers as solo artists. Alongside the national tour, they released a cover of the Donna Summer classic "This Time I Know It's For Real" in May 2006, under the name Young Divas. The song peaked at number two on the ARIA Singles Chart and was certified platinum by the Australian Recording Industry Association (ARIA) for shipments of 70,000 units. A second single followed in November 2006—a cover of Lonnie Gordon's disco classic "Happenin' All Over Again". It peaked at number nine and was certified gold for shipments of 35,000 units. Following on from the success of their singles and tour, the Young Divas released their self-titled debut album, featuring remakes of disco classics, on 14 November 2006. The album debuted at number four on the ARIA Albums Chart and was certified double platinum for shipments of 140,000 units. A cover of Hazell Dean's 1983 hit "Searchin'" was released as the group's third single in March 2007, and reached number 40.

In May 2007, Williams became a contestant on the New Zealand reality television show Pop's Ultimate Star, and placed fourth in the competition. In September 2007, it was revealed that Australian Idol season four runner-up Jessica Mauboy was the new member of the Young Divas replacing Coulter, who left the group to resume her solo career. They then went on to release their second studio album New Attitude on 26 November 2007. The album debuted at number 10 and was certified gold, while its lead single "Turn Me Loose" peaked at number 15. In August 2008, it was announced that both Paulini and Mauboy had quit the Young Divas in order to resume their solo careers, leaving DeAraugo and Williams as the only remaining members. However, both DeAraugo and Williams also resumed their solo careers, and the Young Divas officially disbanded. Following the group's disbandment, Williams' contract with Sony BMG ended.

2009–present: Solo career
In 2010, Williams became a reading ambassador for The Pyjama Foundation, which raises awareness and support to help children improve their literacy skills. On 21 October 2010, she made a television appearance on Ready Steady Cook with fellow Australian Idol contestant Cosima De Vito. On 1 November 2010, she released her debut solo single "Spellbound", independently. The single was promoted by Williams through a live televised performance on The Morning Show. She also performed the song at clubs in Brisbane and Sydney, and also toured shopping malls in Melbourne and Gold Coast. The music video premiered on YouTube on 4 November 2010. In December 2010, Williams received a nomination for "Australian Female Artist of the Year" at the PopRepublic.tv IT List Awards. Williams' second single "You're Mine" was made available for download on 14 February 2011, to coincide with Valentine's Day. She performed the song on The Morning Show. On 1 March 2011, she released a ballad titled "Never Alone", to raise support for the February 2011 Christchurch earthquake. All proceeds from the single went to the New Zealand Red Cross.

Williams' debut solo album Uncovered was released independently on 10 February 2012. In June 2012, she was featured on dance music producer The Popstar's single "Spotlight", which also appeared on her album Uncovered. In April 2013, Williams released her fourth lead single "Get It". In 2013, Williams was featured on British rapper and The Valleys star Leeroy Reed's single "Can't Get Enough" and scored her second nomination at the PopRepublic.tv Awards for "Favourite Australian Female Artist". In January 2014, she was featured on Geordie Shore star Gaz Beadle debut single "Party Like a Rockstar (Up Your Game)" with UK group The Risk. In July 2015, Williams released her fifth lead single "The Way It Is", which debuted at number seven on the AIR 100% Independent Singles Chart. This was followed up by the release of her sixth lead single "Get Your Life" in October 2016, earning her another nomination at the PopRepublic.tv Awards for "Favourite Australian Female Artist".

In 2017, Williams made her musical theatre debut in the Australian production of [[The Bodyguard (musical)|The Bodyguard]], as the alternate lead for Paulini, playing the lead role of Rachel Marron at certain performances. Williams will also make her feature film debut in the upcoming Australian horror film Boar'', due for Australian release in late 2017 and international release in 2019.

Personal life 
Williams' has a daughter named Asia with Richie Lio. She separated from Lio in 2007.

Discography

Studio albums

Singles

As lead artist

As featured artist

Album appearances

Music videos

Awards and nominations

References

External links

1984 births
New Zealand people of Samoan descent
Australian people of Samoan descent
Australian people of New Zealand descent
New Zealand emigrants to Australia
Australian singer-songwriters
Australian contemporary R&B singers
Australian Idol participants
Young Divas members
Musicians from Queensland
Living people
Australian women pop singers
21st-century Australian singers
21st-century Australian women singers
Australian women singer-songwriters